Sindhi Colony is a major suburb of Secunderabad, India. It was founded to house refugee Sindhis coming from Sindh that became a part of Pakistan after the partition of India in 1947. It is to the north of Hyderabad.

The suburb has many smaller residential colonies. Adjacent communities like Babu Bagh, Krishna, Venakat Rao and Jawahar Lal communities are considered part of Sindhi Colony. This suburb is one of the most affluent sections of Secunderabad, home to traders and educated professionals of the city.

History
Historically, before Sindhi Colony was built it was the back water areas of the Hussain Sagar lake to hold excess water. The first dam was built in 1946 by Michael Bakes.

Commercial area
There are many shops for all kinds of needs in this suburb. In 2002, a lot of garment factory outlets opened in the suburb. Many branded clothes for all ranges can be found here at discounted prices. Because of this, people from many parts of the city come to shop here.

There is an RTA office which serves entire Secunderabad Region (AP 10). Many banks started operating since 2002, catering to the growing population of this suburb like Andhra Bank (Sindhi Colony), SBI etc. are located here.

Retailers
Specialist Grocery shops like Heritage Fresh, FabIndia, Food World, Pizza Den are located here.

Restaurants

There are many fast food joints. There are some upmarket restaurants in this suburb ranging from Continental, Chinese and India. Paradise Hotel famous for its biryani is located at the entrance of the colony abutting the MG Road. Popular Punjabi Paratha House (pic above) is one of the most famous landmarks in the area. 
In January 2007, McDonald's opened its second restaurant in Hyderabad near here. There is a KFC and many bakeries like Vacs Pastry, Shangrilla, Cake Basket, etc. are here. Specialist Hyderabadi Restaurants like Hyderabad House, Biryani Durbar and The Pride Residency (includes lodging) are located here. Chinese restaurants like Bowl-O-China is also present here.

Cities and towns in Hyderabad district, India
Neighbourhoods in Hyderabad, India
Geography of Secunderabad